Bonyadabad (also Romanized as Bonyādābād; also known as Bonyādabād and Mükeylān مۆکیلان) is a village in Sanjabad-e Shomali Rural District, in the Central District of Kowsar County, Ardabil Province, Iran. At the 2006 census, its population was 522, in 95 families.

References 

Tageo

Towns and villages in Kowsar County